The Persian-language journal Majlis (Persian: مجلس; DMG: Maǧlis; English: "Parliament" or "Assembly") was published in Tehran between 1906 and 1908. A total of 325 issues was edited in one volume. Each issue consisted of eight pages and was distributed free of charge.

Majlis was considered to be the journal of the Persian Constitutional Revolution and the mouthpiece of the parliament. It was dedicated to publishing parliament's negotiations and their results directly and unfiltrated to the public. Mirza Mohsen Mojtahed was the editor and its chief editor was Seyed Mohammad Hosseini Tabatabaei.

The magazine provided as much information about the rural dimension of the revolution as about the socio-economic situation in the country at that time as well as the various strikes and protests. Letters to the editor also reflected the prevailing controversies between intellectuals, conservatives and the peasantry on various political issues. During the period of its publication, the magazine was not subject to any state censorship.

References

External links
 Online-Version: Maǧlis

1906 establishments in Iran
1908 disestablishments in Iran
Defunct magazines published in Iran
Defunct political magazines
Free magazines
Magazines established in 1906
Magazines disestablished in 1908
Magazines published in Tehran
Persian-language magazines